Bonus malus is a 1993 Italian comedy film directed by Vito Zagarrio.

Cast
Claudio Bigagli as Marco Altoviti
Gigio Alberti as Andrea
Felice Andreasi as Marco's father
Lorella De Luca as Marco's mother
Claudio Bisio as Baldini
Giulia Boschi as Valeria
Claudio Botosso as the doctor
Athina Cenci as Carletti
Francesca D'Aloja as Paola
Antonella Fattori as Cristina
Lino Miccichè as the professor
Novello Novelli as Cecchi
Leonardo Pieraccioni as Nedo
Massimo Ceccherini as Nedo's friend
Alessandro Paci as Nedo's friend
Carlo Monni as Gambacciani
Nina Soldano as Gambacciani's secretary

References

External links

1993 films
1990s Italian-language films
1993 comedy films
Italian comedy films
Films directed by Vito Zagarrio
Films set in Grosseto
Films set in Tuscany
Films shot in Tuscany
1990s Italian films